The Washington Heurichs were an American basketball team based in Washington, D.C. that was a member of the American Basketball League.

For the 1939/40 season, the team was known as the Washington Heurich Brewers and before the 1940/41 season the team became simply the Washington Brewers.

Year-by-year

American Basketball League (1925–1955) teams
Basketball teams in Washington, D.C.